The Church of God and Saints of Christ is a Black Hebrew Israelite religious group established in Lawrence, Kansas, by William Saunders Crowdy in 1896. William Crowdy began congregations in several cities in the Midwestern and Eastern United States, and sent an emissary to organize locations in at least six African countries.  The congregation later established locations in Cuba and the West Indies.

Religious beliefs
 First Key:  The Church of God and Saints of Christ [I Corinthians 1:2]
 Second Key:  Wine is forbidden to be drunk in the Church of God forever [Leviticus 10:9]
 Third Key:  Unleavened bread and water for Christ's body and blood [Matthew 26:26–28]
 Fourth Key:  Foot-Washing is a commandment [John 13:1-8]
 Fifth Key:  The Disciple's Prayer must be taught [Matthew 6:9–14]
 Sixth Key:  You must be breathed upon and saluted into the Church of God with a holy kiss.  [John 20:22, Romans 16:16]
 Seventh Key:  The Ten Commandments must be kept forever [Exodus 20:1–18, Revelation 22:14]
Crowdy believed and taught that Jesus of Nazareth was the Son of God and messiah. Presently, different beliefs are practiced by other organizations who claim to be followers of William Crowdy. The main branch of the organization, headquartered in Belleville, VA, gravitated toward Judaism after the death of William Crowdy. Another branch, headquartered in Cleveland, OH, claims adherence to the founder's original teaching of Jesus Christ as Son of God.

The Church of God and Saints of Christ, headquartered in Belleville, VA, describes itself as "the oldest African-American congregation in the United States that adheres to the tenets of Judaism." The congregation subscribes to the belief in one God, love for all mankind, and the Ten Commandments as the basis for ethical and moral living. It further teaches that, among the descendants of the biblical Israelites, there are peoples of African descent. The congregation believes "in the equality of all men, and the equality of the sexes. . Members believe that Jesus was neither God nor the Son of God, but rather a strict adherent to Judaism and a prophet. They also consider William Saunders Crowdy to be a prophet.

Religious rituals
The Church of God and Saints of Christ synthesizes rituals drawn from both the Hebrew Bible and New Testament. Some of the movement's observances, such as circumscision; use of the Hebrew calendar; the wearing of kippot by men; Sabbatarianism, and celebration of Passover and other religious holy days, are loosely based on the Torah.

Its rites based on the New Testament include baptism (immersion), the consecration of  bread and water as Christ's body and blood, and footwashing.

Despite the name of the faith, members of the Church of God and Saints of Christ are not Christians in the mainstream sense and eschew such labeling.

Facilities
The group established its headquarters in Philadelphia in 1899, and William S. Crowdy later relocated to Washington, D.C., in 1903.

In 1906, Crowdy named Joseph Wesley Crowdy, William Henry Plummer, and Calvin Samuel Skinner as leaders of the congregation. Led by these three individuals, the organization continued to grow in membership.

In 1921, William Henry Plummer moved the organization's headquarters to its permanent location in Belleville (city of Suffolk), Virginia, which was purchased by William S. Crowdy in 1903 as the intended headquarters for the organization.

Howard Zebulun Plummer was consecrated by Calvin S. Skinner as head of the organization in 1931, and served for over 40 years until 1975.

By 1936, the Church of God and Saints of Christ had more than 200 "tabernacles" (congregations) and 37,000 members.

Levi Solomon Plummer became the church's leader in 1975. Under the leadership of Levi Solomon Plummer, the congregation constructed a temple at its headquarters, Temple Beth El, in two phases, the first in 1980 and the second in 1987.

Afterwards, the congregation began to rebuild the headquarters land in Virginia originally purchased by William S. Crowdy. In 2001, the Church of God and Saints of Christ was led by Rabbi Jehu A. Crowdy, Jr., a great-grandson of William Saunders Crowdy. After his death on April 10, 2016 at the age of 46. Chief Rabbi Phillip Eugene McNeil took over its leadership.

As of 2005, it had fifty tabernacles in the United States, dozens in Africa, and one in Kingston, Jamaica.  The organization also manages businesses and residential properties at its headquarters in Suffolk, Virginia, including a hotel and two living communities for senior citizens.

Independent branches
As early as 1909, local branches of the organization severed their ties with the congregation, forming their own organizations.

Today, two of the groups not affiliated with Rabbi Jehu A. Crowdy, Jr. are headquartered in Cleveland, Ohio, and New Haven, Connecticut.

See also
 Church of God and Saints of Christ (Orthodox Christianity)

References

External links
 

Black Hebrew Israelites
Religious organizations established in 1896
Religion in Kansas
1896 establishments in Kansas
Religious belief systems founded in the United States
Historically African-American Christian denominations